The 1965 Southern 500, the 16th running of the event, was a NASCAR Grand National Series event that was held on September 6, 1965, at Darlington Raceway in Darlington, South Carolina.

The entire racing grid was set by time trials and there was no consolation race to determine the final few spots.

It took four hours and nineteen minutes for the race to be completed with Ned Jarrett beating Buck Baker by fourteen laps and 19 laps over third and fourth-place finishers: Darel Dieringer and Roy Mayne. This would remain a NASCAR record to this day.

Background

Darlington Raceway, nicknamed by many NASCAR fans and drivers as "The Lady in Black" or "The Track Too Tough to Tame" and advertised as a "NASCAR Tradition", is a race track built for NASCAR racing located near Darlington, South Carolina. It is of a unique, somewhat egg-shaped design, an oval with the ends of very different configurations, a condition which supposedly arose from the proximity of one end of the track to a minnow pond the owner refused to relocate. This situation makes it very challenging for the crews to set up their cars' handling in a way that will be effective at both ends.

The track is a four-turn  oval. The track's first two turns are banked at twenty-five degrees, while the final two turns are banked two degrees lower at twenty-three degrees. The front stretch (the location of the finish line) and the back stretch is banked at six degrees. Darlington Raceway can seat up to 60,000 people.

Darlington has something of a legendary quality among drivers and older fans; this is probably due to its long track length relative to other NASCAR speedways of its era and hence the first venue where many of them became cognizant of the truly high speeds that stock cars could achieve on a long track. The track allegedly earned the moniker The Lady in Black because the night before the race the track maintenance crew would cover the entire track with fresh asphalt sealant, in the early years of the speedway, thus making the racing surface dark black. Darlington is also known as "The Track Too Tough to Tame" because drivers can run lap after lap without a problem and then bounce off of the wall the following lap. Racers will frequently explain that they have to race the racetrack, not their competition. Drivers hitting the wall are considered to have received their "Darlington Stripe" thanks to the missing paint on the right side of the car.

Race report
Drivers who failed to qualify for this race were: Pee Wee Ellwanger (Dodge), Wendell Scott (Ford), Worth McMillion (Pontiac) and Bernard Alvarez (Ford). Buddy Baker's vehicle overheated on lap 123 even though he was the favorite to win the race.

Jarrett would go on to claim his second NASCAR championship title after the November 7 race at the Dog Track Speedway in Moyock, North Carolina. While 44 cars would start the race, only 15 would survive until the end. On the third lap Buren Skeen spun out and was fatally injured when Reb Wickersham's Ford plowed into Skeen's drivers door. Darel Dieringer broke with 39 laps to go after leading 199 laps, leaving Ned Jarrett alone by 14 laps en route to the win. Every competitive car had problems with the exception of Jarret. 

The race saw a scary melee when young Cale Yarborough crashed with Sam McQuagg in Turn One and Cale's car flew over the guardrail and landed outside the speedway; he was uninjured and interviewed for ABC Sports by Chris Economaki.

The polesitter, Junior Johnson, went out after the first lap and finished last.

Curtis Turner would be permitted to race after Bill France dropped his lifetime ban for promoting a trade union with NASCAR. Richard Petty did not race even though he stopped boycotting Chrysler and the Grand National Series.

Other notable names who participated included: LeeRoy Yarbrough, Elmo Langley, and Darel Dieringer. The winner would walk away with $21,060 while last place would receive $7505. Notable crew chiefs for this race were Franklin McMillion, Herb Nab, Jimmy Thomas, John Ervin, Ray Fox, and Bruce Bacon.

The transition to purpose-built racecars began in the early 1960s and occurred gradually over that decade. Changes made to the sport by the late 1960s brought an end to the "strictly stock" vehicles of the 1950s.

Qualifying

Finishing order
Section reference: 

 Ned Jarrett
 Buck Baker†
 Darel Dieringer*†
 Roy Mayne†
 Buddy Arrington
 H. B. Bailey†
 Stick Elliott
 Frank Warren
 J. T. Putney
 Wendell Scott†
 Fred Lorenzen*
 Jimmy Helms
 Bob Derrington†
 Paul Lewis
 Wayne Smith
 E. J. Trivette
 Bobby Johns*†
 Don Hume
 Dick Hutcherson*†
 G. C. Spencer*†
 Larry Hess*
 Jim Paschal*†
 Bud Harless*†
 Gene Black*†
 Neil Castles*
 Elmo Langley*†
 LeeRoy Yarbrough*†
 Buddy Baker*†
 Sam McQuagg*†
 Cale Yarborough*
 Bunkie Blackburn*†
 Earl Balmer*
 Doug Cooper*†
 Junior Spencer*
 Curtis Turner*†
 Bobby Wawak*†
 Marvin Panch*†
 Henley Gray*
 Tiny Lund*†
 Bud Moore*
 Bert Robbins*
 Buren Skeen*†
 Red Wickersham*
 Junior Johnson*†

† signifies that the driver is known to be deceased 
* Driver failed to finish race

Timeline
Section reference: 
 Start of race: Fred Lorenzen was the pole position as the drivers are given the green flag.
 Lap 1: Junior Johnson's ignition fails to work.
 Lap 2: Reb Wickersham had a terminal crash along with Buren Skeen.
 Lap 3: Bert Robbins had a terminal crash.
 Lap 9: Bud Moore had to leave the race because his vehicle had terrible oil pressure.
 Lap 25: A frame came loose enough off of Tiny Lund's vehicle that he could not race anymore.
 Lap 29: Problems with the vehicle's clutch sent Henley Gray into the garage.
 Lap 33: Darel Dieringer took over the lead from Fred Lorenzen.
 Lap 42: Marvin Panch fell out with engine failure.
 Lap 46: Earl Balmer took over the lead from Darl Dieringer, Bobby Wawak managed to ruin his engine.
 Lap 47: Bobby Johns took over the lead from Earl Balmer.
 Lap 49: Jim Paschal took over the lead from Bobby Johns.
 Lap 51: A wheel bearing came off Curtis Turner's vehicle, rendering him a noncompetitor for the remainder of the event.
 Lap 54: Darel Dieringer took over the lead from Cale Yarbrough.
 Lap 79: Junior Spencer fell out with engine failure.
 Lap 85: The differential of Doug Cooper's vehicle was acting strangely, knocking him out of the race.
 Lap 87: Earl Balmer took over the lead from Darel Deringer.
 Lap 88: Sam McQuagg took over the lead from Earl Balmer.
 Lap 94: Earl Balmer had a terminal crash.
 Lap 109: Bunkie Blackburn had a terminal crash.
 Lap 118: Sam McQuagg and Cale Yarborough both suffered from terminal crashes.
 Lap 119: Darel Dieringer took over the lead from Sam McQuagg.
 Lap 122: Fred Lorenzen took over the lead from Darel Dieringer.
 Lap 123: Jim Paschal took over the lead from Fred Lorenzen; Buddy Baker's engine blew up.
 Lap 129: Ned Jarrett took over the lead from Jim Paschal.
 Lap 134: The differential on LeeRoy Yarbrough's vehicle developed major issues.
 Lap 145: Fred Lorenzen took over the lead from Ned Jarrett.
 Lap 148: Darel Dieringer took over the lead from Fred Lorenzen.
 Lap 167: Fred Lorenzen took over the lead from Darel Dieringer.
 Lap 168: Darel Dieringer took over the lead from Fred Lorenzen.
 Lap 173: Neil Castles had a terminal crash.
 Lap 222: Bud Harless' engine stopped working properly.
 Lap 228: Fred Lorenzen took over the lead from Darel Dieringer.
 Lap 233: Ned Jarrett took over the lead from Fred Lorenzen.
 Lap 240: Darel Dieringer took over the lead from Ned Jarrett.
 Lap 288: Fred Lorenzen took over the lead from Darel Dieringer.
 Lap 293: Dick Hutcherson's engine stopped working properly.
 Lap 301: The differential on Bobby Johns' vehicle developed major issues.
 Lap 303: Darel Dieringer took over the lead from Fred Lorenzen.
 Lap 319: Fred Lorenzen's engine stopped working properly.
 Lap 326: Ned Jarrett took over the lead from Darel Dieringer.
 Lap 345: The differential on Darel Dieringer's vehicle developed major issues.
 Finish: Ned Jarrett was officially declared the winner of the event.

References

Southern 500
Southern 500
NASCAR races at Darlington Raceway